Yaw Amankwa (born April 16, 1994) is an American soccer player who most recently played as a midfielder for South Georgia Tormenta in USL League One.

References

External links
 
 Profile at Ohio State University Athletics
 Profile at Tyler Junior College Athletics

1994 births
Living people
American soccer players
Association football midfielders
Myrtle Beach Mutiny players
Ohio State Buckeyes men's soccer players
Soccer players from Baltimore
Tormenta FC players
Tyler Apaches men's soccer players
USL League One players
USL League Two players